The Kuznetskie Medvedi is a junior ice hockey team from Novokuznetsk, which contains players from the Metallurg Novokuznetsk school. They are members of the Minor Hockey League (MHL), the top tier of junior hockey in the country.

Season-by-season record
Note: GP = Games played, W = Wins, L = Losses, T = Ties, OTW = Overtime/shootout wins, OTL = Overtime/shootout losses, Pts = Points, GF = Goals for, GA = Goals against

Head coaches
 Sergei Krasilnikov 2009-11
 Alexander Kitov 2011-present

External links 
Official Page

2009 establishments in Russia
Metallurg Novokuznetsk
Ice hockey clubs established in 2009
Ice hockey teams in Russia
Junior Hockey League (Russia) teams